Christine Willes is a Canadian television, theatre and film actress who is best known for her roles as Delores Herbig on the Showtime comedy-drama Dead Like Me and Gladys the DMV demon on the CW supernatural drama television series Reaper. She is also known for her role as Granny Goodness on the CW series Smallville.

Career
Willes played the recurring role of Agent Karen E. Kosseff, a government counselor, on the TV show The X-Files. She also appears in a minor recurring role on the show Reaper on The CW, as Gladys, a demon from Hell who works in the DMV. She was nominated for a Leo Award in 2008 for that role. Like her Dead Like Me co-star Callum Blue, she was cast as the villain Granny Goodness on The CW's Smallville'''s tenth and final season (Blue appeared in the previous season as Zod). She also had a small role in the award-winning film Trick r Treat starring Anna Paquin, which also featured another Dead Like Me co-star, Britt McKillip. She also played Vera Kane on CW series the 100.

Christine appeared as Madam Lazar in Catherine Hardwicke's production of Red Riding Hood.She has won three Jessie Richardson Theatre Awards, and both produced and starred in Jasmina Reza's The Unexpected Man. She directed Metamorphoses at Pacific Theatre in August 2008, and played Clara Epp in Touchstone Theatre's 2010 World Premiere of Sally Stubb's Herr Beckmann's People.''

Willes had a recurring role as Patty Deckler in the third series of the drama series Mistresses in 2015.

Filmography

Film

Television

External links
 

Canadian film actresses
Place of birth missing (living people)
Canadian television actresses
Drama teachers
Living people
Year of birth missing (living people)